The 2016 Aspen Dental Eldora Dirt Derby was the 11th stock car race of the 2016 NASCAR Camping World Truck Series, and the 4th iteration of the event. The race was held on Wednesday, July 20, 2016, in Rossburg, Ohio at Eldora Speedway, a 0.5-mile (0.80 km) permanent oval shaped dirt track. The race took the scheduled 150 laps to complete. Kyle Larson, driving for GMS Racing, held off Christopher Bell with 16 laps to go, and earned his second NASCAR Camping World Truck Series win, and his first of the season. Bobby Pierce would dominate the entire race, leading 102 laps until hitting the wall and blowing a tire with 25 laps to go.

Background 

Located north of Rossburg, Ohio in the village of New Weston, Ohio, it features permanent and festival-style seating believed to be in the range of 30,000. The 22,000 permanent grandstand and VIP suite seats make it the largest sports stadium in the Dayton, Ohio-region according to the Dayton Business Journal.

Entry list 

 (R) denotes rookie driver.
 (i) denotes driver who is ineligible for series driver points.

Practice

First practice 
The first practice session was held on Tuesday, July 19, at 6:30 pm EST, and would last for 1 hour and 25 minutes.

Final practice 
The final practice session was held on Tuesday, July 19, at 9:00 pm EST, and would last for about 55 minutes.

Heat qualifying 
Qualifying for the heat races were held on Wednesday, July 20, at 5:15 pm EST. Each driver would have one lap to set a fastest time; in which that lap would count as their official qualifying lap. Qualifying would set the grid positions for the five heat races; first would get first in heat one, second first in heat two, etc. in a repeating order until the slowest car.

Full qualifying results

Heat #1

Heat #2

Heat #3

Heat #4

Heat #5

Last Chance Qualifier 
The Last Chance Qualifier was held on Wednesday, July 20, at 8:15 PM EST. The race was held for all drivers that did not finish in the top 5 in each of the five heat races. Drivers with high enough owner points would automatically advance to the main event, while drivers with little to no owner points had to finish inside the top two. Cody Coughlin, driving for Kyle Busch Motorsports, would win the Last Chance Qualifier and take the 26th spot. Chris Fontaine, Korbin Forrister, Norm Benning, Sean Corr, and Caleb Roark would fail to qualify for the main event.

Full starting lineup

Race results

Standings after the race 

Drivers' Championship standings

Note: Only the first 8 positions are included for the driver standings.

References 

NASCAR races at Eldora Speedway
July 2016 sports events in the United States
2016 in sports in Ohio